is a Japanese mangaka born on July 15, 1963, in Osaka.

Selected bibliography

Manga and anime
 A.D. Police Files (1990)
 Dr Kishiwada's Scientific Affection (1992–98)
 Genocyber (1993)
 Space Pinchy (2002)
 Tony Takezaki no Gundam Manga (2004)
 Tony Takezaki no Evangelion (2010)

External links
  Tony's (Tony Takezaki's original website)
Review of Dr. Kishiwada

1963 births
Manga artists
Living people